Guitar Slinger is the twelfth studio album by American country music artist Vince Gill. It was released on October 25, 2011 via MCA Nashville. A deluxe edition was also released with three bonus tracks.

Lead-off single "Threaten Me with Heaven" received a nomination on the 54th Grammy Awards for Best Country Song and also a nomination for Song of the Year
on the 47th Academy of Country Music Awards.

Track listing

Personnel 
Credits from European version:
 Vince Gill – lead vocals, electric guitar (1-8, 10, 11, 12, 14), acoustic guitar (2, 3, 4, 6-15), backing vocals (6, 8, 10), banjo (11), mandolin (11)
 John Hobbs – acoustic piano (1, 3, 6, 7, 8, 10, 12, 13, 14), keyboards (2), Hammond B3 organ (3-6, 8, 9, 13, 14), accordion (11)
 Pete Wasner – synthesizers, Hammond B3 organ (1, 7), Wurlitzer electric piano (3, 5, 8) acoustic piano (4, 9, 11), Rhodes (4), Wurlitzer organ (10)
 Richard Bennett – acoustic guitar (1, 5, 7, 10, 12, 13), electric guitar (4, 14)
 Tom Bukovac – electric guitar (1, 3, 4, 5, 7, 8, 10)
 Al Anderson – electric guitar (2)
 Tom Britt – electric guitar (3, 9, 15)
 Will Owsley – electric guitar (4, 7)
 Andy Riess – electric guitar (15)
 Paul Franklin – steel guitar (1, 2, 10, 12-15),  dobro (5)
 Russ Pahl – steel guitar (9)
 Glenn Worf – bass guitar (1, 5, 10)
 Michael Rhodes – bass guitar (2, 3, 4, 6, 7, 11-14)
 David Hungate – bass guitar (8, 9)
 Dennis Crouch – upright bass (15)
 Chad Cromwell – drums (1, 3-8, 10, 11)
 Eddie Bayers – drums (2, 12, 13, 14)
 Rick Vanaugh – drums (15)
 Eric Darken – percussion
 Larry Franklin – fiddle (12, 13)
 Aubrey Haynie – fiddle (15)
 Kenny Sears – fiddle (15)
 Joe Spivey – fiddle (15)
 Bekka Bramlett – backing vocals (1, 3, 4, 15)
 Jenny Gill – backing vocals (1-7, 9, 10)
 Chris Stapleton – backing vocals (2, 3, 4)
 Billy Thomas – backing vocals (2, 3, 4, 5, 15), drums (9)
 Amy Grant – backing vocals (4, 8), lead vocals (8)
 Kim Keyes – backing vocals (4)
 Gene Miller – backing vocals (4, 7)
 Dawn Sears – backing vocals (5, 13)
 Jeff White – backing vocals (5, 9, 11, 15)
 Ashley Monroe – backing vocals (6)
 Sarah Chapman – backing vocals (8)
 Andrea Zonn – backing vocals (9, 11), fiddle (11)
 Corrina Gill – backing vocals (10)
 Wes Hightower – backing vocals (12, 13)
 Lee Ann Womack – backing vocals (12)
 Sonya Isaacs – backing vocals (14)
 Sarah Siskind – backing vocals (14)

Chart performance
As of December 2015, the album had sold 102,000 copies.

Album

Singles

References

External links
 

2011 albums
Vince Gill albums
MCA Records albums